The following is a list of recurring Saturday Night Live characters and sketches introduced between September 26, 1992, and May 15, 1993, the eighteenth season of SNL.

Tiny Elvis
Nicolas Cage plays Tiny Elvis. Rob Schneider plays Sonny, Kevin Nealon plays Red, and Chris Farley plays Joe Esposito, in stereotypical "Memphis Mafia" roles.  The sketch would be about a tiny Elvis Presley, with sycophantic characters laughing at any jokes he made while drawing attention to the relative hugeness of ordinary objects.  Remarks about his size in relation to his cuteness elicit threats of a physical nature from the king. The sketch would end by singing "I'm Tiny Elvis!" Debuted September 26, 1992.

Larry King Live
A parody of Larry King Live, with Kevin Nealon impersonating host Larry King.

Appearances

Hollywood Minute
David Spade makes professional and personal attacks against celebrities. The segment consisted of a series of sarcastic one-liners against various celebrities, whose pictures were usually shown in one of the upper corners of the screen. Debuted October 3, 1992.

Originally a section of "Weekend Update" Spade received a regular segment, Spade in America. Spade used a hand-puppet of himself to reprise this role when he returned to SNL as a guest host, stating that he didn't feel like insulting celebrities anymore, but that didn't mean that a puppet couldn't.

In one notable instance, a picture of former SNL cast member Eddie Murphy appeared onscreen and Spade exclaimed, "Look, children, it's a falling star. Make a wish!" referring to Murphy's lack of box office success at the time. This caused a major feud between SNL and Murphy. In another segment, he began to mock Steve Martin, but then Martin appeared behind him. Upon turning around and seeing Martin was there, Spade got up and ran off. Martin then sat in Spade's chair and began roasting Spade.

In 2005, Spade took this format to Comedy Central and made it the featured segment on his weekly program entitled The Showbiz Show with David Spade.

Appearances

Audience McGee
An Adam Sandler sketch. Debuted October 24, 1992.

Hank Fielding
Hank Fielding was a commentator played by Robert Smigel who provided the "Moron's Perspective". He appeared to be an average commentator, but his speech was indicative that he was extremely slow, and that he clearly had a difficulty discerning fantasy from reality. In one appearance, he commented on President Bill Clinton's State of the Union Address, complaining that his overly long speech pre-empted other shows like Jake and the Fatman, making actor William Conrad wait nervously backstage as the President "rambled on". His appearance was supplemented by an extremely slow scrawling of his signature across the screen. Debuted November 14, 1992.

Tony Vallencourt
An Adam Sandler sketch. The character spoke with a heavy New England accent and was meant to spoof the white trash of Massachusetts and Rhode Island; denouncing those who studied diligently and looking to maximize workmen's compensation claims. The character also had a brother, who appeared as "The Vallencourt Boys". Tony Vallencourt also appeared as a contestant on "What's the Best Way?", a game show skit where different geographic areas in New England were chosen at random, and players had to tell of which route to take. 
Debuted December 12, 1992.

Gap Girls
An Adam Sandler, David Spade sketch, where the characters in drag would make valley girl slang and not take their jobs seriously, often telling complaining customers to "cinch it". Their enemy was Tracy, played by Rob Schneider, whom they called the "Donut Hut Slut" as a rhyming insult for working at a donut place in the same shopping mall as them. The sketch was best remembered for a line where Chris Farley was eating most of the Gap girls' french fries and Spade's character reminds "her" they were on a diet, to which the character immediately went from a valley girl falsetto to a deep, possessed voice, shouting "LAY OFF ME, I'M STARVING!", causing Sandler and Spade to struggle not to break character, with Sandler attempting to stifle his laughter as Farley was fake-choking Spade.  Debuted January 9, 1993.

Appearances

Sassy's Sassiest Boys
Phil Hartman played Russell Clark, editor of Sassy Magazine, who interviewed young, male celebrities of the day, and incessantly repeated the term "Sassy!", or variations of it ("The French have a word for it: Sassé!" or "Looks like someone stepped in a big pile of Sassy!") after each guest's response. Guests included Joey Lawrence (played by Mike Myers) whose sole response to everything was the expression, "Whoa!" (his character's catchphrase on the sitcom, Blossom). Adam Sandler made an appearance as "Marky" Mark Wahlberg and Jay Mohr appeared as Andrew McCarthy, still lamenting his breakup with Molly Ringwald (continuously repeating "I love her, man.") Debuted February 6, 1993.

Canteen Boy

An Adam Sandler sketch. Debuted March 13, 1993.

Hub's Gyros ("You like-a the juice?")
Rob Schneider, Robert Smigel, Chris Farley and Adam Sandler play workers at a gyro restaurant. Whenever a customer asks for more or extra sauce (or "juice"), they would all get intensely interested and reply back in a Greek accent something like: "You like the juice? The juice is good? I get you more juice!"  Debuted April 10, 1993.

Bennett Brauer
Bennett Brauer was played by Chris Farley. Debuted April 10, 1993. In each appearance, Brauer would be brought on to provide commentary for Kevin Nealon's Weekend Update. However, instead of providing commentary, he would launch into a tirade about how surprised he is that the network has let him back on the air before vividly describing his poor hygiene, lack of social grace, and resentment towards the viewers for preferring other, more photogenic commentators to him. Brauer would make regular use of air quotes to emphasize every point he made. For example:

Maybe I'm not "the norm". I'm not "camera friendly". I don't "wear clothes that fit me". I'm not a "heartbreaker". I haven't "had sex with a woman"; I don't know "how that works". I guess I don't "fall in line". I'm not "hygienic". I don't "wipe properly". I lack "style". I have no "charisma" or "self esteem". I don't "own a toothbrush" or "let my scabs heal". I can't "reach all the parts of my body". When I sleep, I "sweat profusely".

In one instance, Brauer was made to fly (via cables), although the cables became entangled with studio lighting, thereby creating one of SNL's most famous bloopers. As Nealon and a stagehand try to untangle the cables, Brauer exclaims (with air quotes), "I have a weight problem! Can't they lift me?" After the cables are freed, Brauer is then lifted high above a cheering audience in a manner akin to Peter Pan. Kevin Nealon then continues the Weekend Update and the closing music is playing when a loud crash is heard. The cable has broken and a disheveled Bennett emerges from the counter; which has been damaged by his fall.

Appearances

Matt Foley

A Chris Farley sketch. Debuted May 8, 1993.

Appearances

References

Lists of recurring Saturday Night Live characters and sketches
Saturday Night Live in the 1990s
Saturday Night Live
Saturday Night Live